Senator Byrd may refer to:

Adam M. Byrd (1859–1912), Mississippi State Senate
Harriet Elizabeth Byrd (1926–2015), Wyoming State Senate
Harry F. Byrd Jr. (1914–2013), U.S. Senator from Virginia from 1965 to 1983
Harry F. Byrd (1887–1966), U.S. Senator from Virginia from 1933 to 1965
Richard C. Byrd (1805–1854), Arkansas State Senate
Robert K. Byrd (1823–1885), Tennessee State Senate
Robert Byrd (1917–2010), U.S. Senator from West Virginia from 1959 to 2010

See also
Senator Bird (disambiguation)